Gray County Wind Farm near Montezuma, Kansas was the largest wind farm in Kansas and the largest in the United States not mandated by a state regulatory commission back in 2001. The site consists of 170 Vestas V-47 wind turbines with a total nameplate capacity of 112 MW. Each turbine tower is 217 feet high, with blades 77 feet long, and a generating capacity of 660 kW. Owned and operated by NextEra Energy Resources, Gray County Wind Farm became fully operational in November 2001. Its construction cost an estimated $100 million.  The average wind speed at the site is approximately 20 mph. The area is primarily used for farmland.

See also 

 Elk River Wind Project
 Smoky Hills Wind Farm

References

External links 
 

Energy infrastructure completed in 2001
Wind farms in Kansas
Buildings and structures in Gray County, Kansas
2001 establishments in Kansas
NextEra Energy